Lac-des-Dix-Milles is an unorganized territory in the Lanaudière region of Quebec, Canada, part of the Matawinie Regional County Municipality. This square-shaped territory is entirely within the Mont-Tremblant National Park.

Demographics

Population

See also
List of unorganized territories in Quebec

References

Unorganized territories in Lanaudière
Matawinie Regional County Municipality